Iva cheiranthifolia, the fly marsh elder, is a Caribbean species of flowering plants in the family Asteraceae. It has been found in Cuba, the Bahamas, and the Cayman Islands.

References

cheiranthifolia
Flora of the Caribbean
Plants described in 1818
Flora without expected TNC conservation status